Bozeman Public Schools is a school district located in Bozeman, Montana, USA. The district's superintendent is Bob Connors "Bozeman Public Schools exist to provide an outstanding education that inspires and ensures high achievement so every student can succeed and make a difference in a rapidly changing world community." Bozeman Public Schools operates the following Schools:

High schools 
The high schools in the district operate 9th-12th grade

Bozeman High School
Bozeman Gallatin High School
Bridger Charter Academy

Middle schools 
The middle schools in the district operate 6th-8th grade

Chief Joseph Middle School
Sacajawea Middle School

Elementary schools
The elementary schools in the district operate kindergarten-5th grade

Emily Dickinson Elementary School
Hawthorne Elementary School
Hyalite Elementary School
Irving Elementary School
Longfellow Elementary School
Meadowlark Elementary School
Morning Star Elementary School
Whittier Elementary School

References

External links
Bozeman Public Schools
Bozeman Schools Foundation

Education in Gallatin County, Montana
School districts in Montana